St John Plessington Catholic College (SJP) is a Roman Catholic secondary school and sixth form with academy status located in Bebington, Wirral, England. St John Plessington is in partnership with multiple other schools including St Mary's College, Wallasey in the Holy Family Multi Academy Trust.

The school has close relations with the nearby primary schools, one in very close proximity (across the road) to SJP, St. John's Junior School. They are often referred to as sister schools. The pupils of St. John's make frequent visits to SJP for mass and plays and often over 70% of the pupils at St. John's will transfer to SJP for Year 7, the first year of secondary school. The primary school and SJP make good use of The Oval, a sports facility between the two schools, often using its facilities to host events such as 'sports days' and just regular use for physical education. The school is credited with the M&S savers award of 2007/08. The school was also given the lesser award of the 'Sportsmark Gold', awarded by Sport England.

Patron Saint

The house is named after St. John Plessington, one the 40th Catholic martyrs of England and Wales. Plessington was born in 1637 in Garstang, Lancashire, and ordained a Priest in Segovia on 25 March 1662. A year later St. Plessington returned to England, where he ministered to recusant and covert Roman Catholics in Holywell and Cheshire. He was arrested during the Popish Plot scare on the charge of being a Roman Catholic priest, and then imprisoned for two months. He was hung, drawn and quartered on 19 July 1679. In celebration of their patron saint, the school holds an annual St John Plessington day on 19 July where all students and teachers take part in a various spiritual and recreational activities.

History
The current school site was originally St John's secondary School. After a merger with Rock Ferry Covent in the late 1970s it became Plessington High School and occupied two sites (the second being the former Rock Ferry Covent site in Woodland Road). The school was awarded 'Technology College' status in 1998. In 2010, the school won the prestigious TES "Secondary School of the Year" award. Students maliciously activating the fire alarms is common, in some cases this has happened twice in the same day. The school has also had multiple incidents of bullying at it not being resolved as well as racism happening in the school, this has led to the school doing showing the red card to racism and anti-bullying assemblies.

Catholic Ethos
The School itself is named after a patron saint, and has a very strong Roman Catholic ethos which can be seen throughout the corridors and classrooms with posters. There is a twice weekly optional Mass in the chapel held by the school chaplain. On holy days Masses are held for the whole school by a local priest.

Facilities
With the recent development of the school campus in the form of new buildings, opened by Cherie Blair, the school has gained six ICT rooms and a main hall/atrium. The school has a six-room dedicated SEN centre off the dining hall staffed with 10+ teaching assistants for pupils with mental or learning disabilities. In the old building the school has two fully equipped Art rooms with paint and ceramic facilities. The SEN centre has access to the lift and disabled toilets throughout the building. A drama studio is situated next to the Dinner Hall. The school is a member of the SAMLearning online revision service, every pupil has an account and it is used to help students revise and teachers also have the ability to set online homework activities. The school separate toilets for year 7's and 2 sets of male and female toilets for years 8-11, however most of the time at least 1 set is closed due to vandalism or cleaning. The school also has separate toilets for sixth formers, there is one male cubicle for years 12-13 to share and there are 2 female cubicles for years 12-13 to share.

Timetable

The school keeps a traditional timetable of 5 lessons per day. A "period 6" was introduced which extended the school day, providing more teaching time particularly for Maths to better prepare students for their GCSEs, however this has been removed likely due to covid-19 restrictions. Also the school introduced a new 'wind-down' type period following lunchtime, a time where students could often be very energetic and not fully focused for work, the period named 'Personal development’ consists of students doing PHSE and reading. This replaces traditional form time at the start of the day. The time is spent with a form and form tutor and it includes such activities as checking that planners are correctly filled out and doing attendance reports.

School dining
Since the introduction of the old headteacher, Thomas Quinn, the school's dinner menu increased vastly in variety, the typical menu for the preceding year would have been chips on an almost daily basis and now only on Fridays improving the student's diet. For example, the chocolate in cookies has been replaced with raisins. Since then the school started to start using potato wedges instead of chips which led to some students not eating anything for lunch, it has now changed so that chips are on every other Friday with potato wedges being served on the friday's when chips aren't being served.

New buildings

Since the mid-1990s the school has undergone many changes, the building of the music suite was completed by 1992, the sports hall was completed by 1993, and officially opened by the Duke of York, Prince Andrew, in 1993. In 1994 the sixth-form building was completed (now used as the science building). In 2003, the school took over twelve newly built classrooms which house the RE and English departments and in 2004 benefited from a £5m building program which gave the school twelve additional classrooms, housing the Maths and Modern Foreign Languages(now ICT), two new DT workshops, a new library, a new main hall, a new atrium, reception and administrative area and a new sixth form common room. The dining room has also been enlarged and refurbished and a new area has been designated for Special Educational Needs (now used for the Assisi Centre/internal exclusion), this has since changed and is now used as a first aid area. A new extension is being built at the side of the RE and English building. This will provide improved access for the Sixth Form with improved independent study areas and additional classrooms housing the Media department. The Building will have direct access to the library and, in 2015, a new six form block was opened. In December 2021 it was announced that there would be a new build of a classroom block, the school had planning permission approved over 5 years before from Wirral council  a raised decking area for sixth form students was removed to make room for this.

Pastoral care
There are numerous pastoral systems in place in SJP which care for a student's college life. The two most notable pastoral system are the form and year group systems. Each year group comprises ten forms which are each named after one of the forty catholic martyrs of England and Wales and then divided up into two half-year groups named Alpha and Beta. These ten forms are:

Alpha Half Year:
 JB - abbreviating St. John Bosco.
 VP - abbreviating Vincent Price.
 MT - abbreviating Mother Teresa.
 TL - abbreviating St. Therese of Lisieux
 DT - abbreviating Desmond Tutu
Beta Half Year:
 BH - abbreviating Basil Hume.
 SB - abbreviating S. R. Bommai.
 OR - abbreviating St. Óscar Romero.
 MK - abbreviating Maximillian Kolbe.
 KW - abbreviating Kitty Wilkinson

Each year group has key members of staff: An assistant headteacher, who is a member of SLT. A Head of Learning, who is in charge of the year group. And a Learning Coach, who is a non-teaching member of staff who deals with a majority of the incidents.

The school also enables and encourages students to report incidents of bullying, theft, crime or any unwanted behaviour in confidence to their school 24 hours a day via the TextSomeone system the school has introduced, along with the CallParents and Truancy Call systems, introduced to free up staff time usually consumed with administrative tasks.

References

External links
 Latest Ofsted Inspection 
 School Website
 Virtual tours of a selection of the school facilities

Catholic secondary schools in the Diocese of Shrewsbury
Secondary schools in the Metropolitan Borough of Wirral
Academies in the Metropolitan Borough of Wirral